Mark Docherty is a Canadian politician, who was elected to the Legislative Assembly of Saskatchewan in the 2011 election. He represents the electoral district of Regina Coronation Park as a member of the Saskatchewan Party caucus.
On March 10, 2018, he was elected Speaker of the Legislative Assembly. Following the 2020 general election, Docherty once again stood for election as Speaker, but was defeated on the final ballot by Randy Weekes. He resigned from the legislative assembly effective February 10, 2023.

Cabinet positions

References

Living people
Saskatchewan Party MLAs
Speakers of the Legislative Assembly of Saskatchewan
Politicians from Regina, Saskatchewan
21st-century Canadian politicians
Members of the Executive Council of Saskatchewan
Year of birth missing (living people)